Jonathan Paul Taylor (born 8 August 1964) is an English former cricketer, who played in two Test matches and one One Day International for England in 1993 and 1994.

Life and career
He began his career at Derbyshire but, unable to cement a regular place in the side, was released in 1987.  He went on to play Minor County cricket for Staffordshire and so impressed Northants during a NatWest Trophy tie in 1990, despite conceding 92 runs in his stint, that he was engaged for the 1991 season.  His rebirth in county cricket proved so productive that he was picked to tour India, although he suffered with the rest of England's bowling attack in the defeat in Calcutta.  He played one more Test, against New Zealand in 1994 but, despite bowling tidily and blocking out the last half-hour to save the game in partnership with Steve Rhodes, was not picked for England again.

He remained a consistent wicket-taker through the 1990s, renowned for his fitness and the accuracy of his left arm seamers.  In eleven seasons he took over 500 first-class wickets for Northamptonshire, until his release in 2001.

Taylor also made sporadic appearances in Sunday morning football, for Coleorton Hall in the Charnwood Sunday League.

References

1964 births
Living people
England Test cricketers
England One Day International cricketers
English cricketers
Norfolk cricketers
Derbyshire cricketers
Northamptonshire cricketers
Staffordshire cricketers
People from Ashby-de-la-Zouch
Cricketers from Leicestershire